Montecosaro is a comune (municipality) in the Province of Macerata in the Italian region Marche, located about  southeast of Ancona and about  east of Macerata.

Montecosaro borders the following municipalities: Civitanova Marche, Montegranaro, Montelupone, Morrovalle, Potenza Picena, Sant'Elpidio a Mare.
  
Among the religious buildings in the town are:
Santa Maria a Pie’ di Chienti: church rebuilt in 1125 in Romanesque style.
Sant'Agostino: Romanesque church rebuilt starting in 16th century.

Notable people
Anita Cerquetti (1931-2014), operatic soprano
Romolo Marcellini (1910-1999), film director

References

External links
 Official website

Cities and towns in the Marche